Vaddu may refer to:
 Vaddu, India
 Vaddu, Iran